Under-23 sport is a competitive age category grouping within sports for athletes under the age of twenty-three. An extension of age categories found in youth sports, the under-23 category is for adults who are still in a developmental stage within their chosen discipline. The intention of the grouping is to allow such adults to improve their skills against opponents of a similar standard, as opposed to elite level of competition found in open senior level competitions, where they may not receive competitive opportunities or may find their development hindered by significant ability differences.

The under-23 category roughly corresponds with the age of athletes found competing in college athletics, although in the latter grouping there is a required academic element for student-athletes and typically no upper age limit (in the case of adult learners).

The age group somewhat aligns with social definitions used outside of sport, such as the United Nations' definition of youth as "persons between the ages of 15 and 24 years".

International competitions
Under-23 athletics
NACAC Under-23 Championships in Athletics
South American Under-23 Championships in Athletics
European Athletics U23 Championships
European Cross Country Championships (race)
Cycling
UCI Road World Championships – Men's under-23 road race
UCI Road World Championships – Men's under-23 time trial
UEC European Track Championships (under-23 & junior)
African Continental Cycling Championships (section)
Oceanian Cycling Championships (section)
Liège–Bastogne–Liège U23
Peace Race U23
Thüringen Rundfahrt der U23
 Tour de l'Avenir (since 2007)
Football
Olympic Games
AFC U-23 Championship
AFF U-23 Youth Championship
Africa U-23 Cup of Nations
GCC U-23 Championship
Volleyball
FIVB Volleyball Women's U23 World Championship
FIVB Volleyball Men's U23 World Championship
Men's Asian U23 Volleyball Championship
Women's Asian U23 Volleyball Championship
Men's U23 African Volleyball Championship
Women's U23 African Volleyball Championship
Men's U23 Pan-American Volleyball Cup
Women's U23 Pan-American Volleyball Cup
Men's U23 South American Volleyball Championship
Women's U22 South American Volleyball Championship
Other sports
Bandy World Championship Y-23
European U23 Judo Championships
European U23 Wrestling Championships
IWAS Under 23 World Games
U-23 Baseball World Cup
World Rowing U23 Championships

See also
 Under-23 athletics

References